FPT, officially the FPT Corporation ("FPT" stands for Financing and Promoting Technology), is the largest information technology service company in Vietnam with its core business focusing on consulting, providing and deploying technology and telecommunications services and solutions. Moreover, as an educational brand with international impact, FPT has fully expanded its educational levels to provide the labor market with high quality human resources.

History 
On September 13, 1988, the director of the National Institute of Technology Research signed a decision to establish The Food Processing Technology Company (FPT's original name), operating in the fields of drying technology, information technology and automation technology.

On October 27, 1990, the company was renamed The Corporation for Financing and Promoting Technology (FPT for short), specializing in information technology.

In 1998, FPT became one of the four leading Internet service providers in Vietnam to create a breakthrough in this field.

FPT has been put into operation under the model of a joint stock company since 2002.

On September 8, 2006, the FPT University was founded under FPT, becoming the first licensed cooperate university. Key people of the university were Dr. Le Truong Tung - the first dean and Associate Professor Truong Gia Binh - the chairman of the board.

On October 24, 2006, FPT announced its decision to issue additional shares to two strategic investors, Texas Pacific Group (TPG) and Intel Capital. FPT received an investment of $36.5 million through TPG Ventures and Intel Capital.

On November 18, 2006, Microsoft and FPT signed a strategic alliance agreement.

On December 13, 2006, FPT stock was listed on the Ho Chi Minh City Stock Exchange (HOSE).

On December 19, 2008, FPT Corporation was approved to change its name from "The Corporation for Financing and Promoting Technology" to "FPT Corporation".

On December 24, 2008, FPT Corporation announced a decision to appoint Mr. Nguyen Thanh Nam as the CEO of FPT Group, replacing Mr. Truong Gia Binh. Mr. Nguyen Thanh Nam is a founding member of FPT Corporation, Chairman of FPT Software (FSOFT).

In February 2011, the board of directors of FPT Corporation issued a resolution appointing Mr. Truong Dinh Anh as general director to replace Mr. Nguyen Thanh Nam.

On July 31, 2013, the board of directors of FPT Corporation approved the appointment of Mr. Bui Quang Ngoc, Ph.D. in database, to replace Mr. Truong Gia Binh as FPT's general director. Mr. Bui Quang Ngoc is one of the founding members and currently vice chairman of FPT.

In 2014, FPT was the first IT company in Vietnam to acquire a foreign IT company, RWE IT Slovakia (a member of RWE, a European leading energy corporation).

In August 2017, FPT transferred 30% of its ownership in FPT Retail to Vina Capital and Dragon Capital, reducing its stake in FPT Retail to 55%.

In September 2017, FPT transferred 47% of its ownership in FPT Trading to Synnex Corporation (Taiwan), reducing its stake in FPT Trading to 48%.

In July 2018, FPT acquired 90% stake in Intellinet Consulting (Intellinet), one of the fastest growing technology consulting companies in the US.

In March 2019, FPT appointed Mr. Nguyen Van Khoa - Executive Vice President of FPT and CEO of FPT Information System  - to take the position of FPT's CEO, replacing Mr. Bui Quang Ngoc at the end of his term.

In May 2021, FPT acquired Base.vn, a SaaS start-up.

In July 2021, FPT invested in Intertec International. 

In August 2021, FPT launched eCovax – the digital “vaccine” program that helps businesses respond – recover – thrive in Covid-19. 

On September 16, 2021, FPT's Chairman Truong Gia Binh initiated the idea of building a school for children who lost their parents due to COVID-19 with the desire to create a safe environment for them to be cared for, loved, and trained. In addition, the school aimed to turn their pain into power, growing up and contributing to the country's future growth.

FPT has strengthened its presence in 27 countries by opening a second office in New York in May 2022 and the first representative office in Northern Europe in Copenhagen, Denmark in September 2022.

In September 2022, Deputy Prime Minister of Singapore Heng Swee Keat visited FPT with the aim of promoting partnership and cooperation of private sector enterprises between Vietnam and Singapore.

In October 2022, FPT invested in Japanese business consulting services provider LTS Inc., becoming its strategic shareholder.

Organizational structure 
8 Subsidiaries:
 FPT Software
 FPT Information System
 FPT Telecom
 FPT Online
 FPT Education
 FPT Investment
 FPT Smart Cloud
 FPT Digital
2 Associates:
 Synnex FPT
 FPT Retail

Business sectors
 Technology: Software development; System integration; IT services
 Telecommunications: Telecom services; Digital content
 Education: From K1-K12; Vocational school; Undergraduate education; Postgraduate education; International affiliate programs and Online training

Achievements

National level 
 Top 20 largest private enterprises in Vietnam according to VNR500 ranking (From 2007 to 2021)
 No. 1 in the field of system integration; IT services, online advertising in Vietnam
 No. 2 in fixed broadband internet access services in Vietnam (Vietnam ICT White Paper 2014 released by the Ministry of Information and Communications)
 #1 Best Workplace in the IT/Software & Applications/E-Commerce Industry, and Top 50 Vietnamese Enterprises with Attractive Employer Brands in 2021
 'Made by FPT' products were received Sao Khue Award over the years (From 2015 to 2022)
 Top 50 best listed companies in Vietnam by Forbes Vietnam (From 2012 to 2022)
 Top 3 Large-caps with investors' most favored IR activities and Top 3 Large-caps with financial institutions' most appreciated IR activities (In 2022)

International level 
 Top 100 Global Service Providers by IAOP
 Top 300 Asian Enterprises by Nikkei
 Top 130 Best Companies to Work for in Asia
 Vietnam's leading data center service provider honored by W.Media Asia Pacific
 The first university in Vietnam to be awarded a 3-star ranking by the QS World University Rankings for three consecutive terms

References

External links

 FPT corporate website
 

Companies listed on the Ho Chi Minh City Stock Exchange
Companies based in Hanoi
Information technology companies of Vietnam